This article contains information about the literary events and publications of 1711.

Events
March 1 – The periodical The Spectator is founded by Joseph Addison and Richard Steele in London.
May 23 – Robert Harley, author, statesman and friend to the "Tory wits," who has been involved in Anne, Queen of Great Britain's ministry for some time, is created Earl of Oxford.
July – After defeat at the Battle of Stănileşti during the Pruth River Campaign, Dimitrie Cantemir flees to Russia and begins writing his most important works.
December – Charles Gildon becomes editor of The British Mercury.
unknown date – The English fairy tale Jack the Giant-Killer appears in print for the first time.

New books

Prose
Francis Atterbury – Representation of the State of Religion
Richard Blackmore – The Nature of Man
Pierre Boileau – The Works of Monsieur Boileau, vol. 1 (published by John Ozell)
Laurent Bordelon – Gomgam, ou l'Homme prodigieux transporté dans l'air, sur la terre et sous les eaux (Gomgam, the remarkable man transported through the air, on the ground and under the water)
Abel Boyer – The Political State of Great Britain
Cornelis de Bruijn – Reizen over Moskovie, door Persie en Indie (Voyage to the Levant and Travels into Moscovy, Persia, and the East Indies)
Jean Chardin – Voyages de monsieur le chevalier Chardin en Perse et autres lieux de l'orient (The Travels of Sir John Chardin in Persia and the Orient)
Giuseppe Colombani – Unnamed treatise on the use of the spadone
Anthony Ashley Cooper, 3rd Earl of Shaftesbury – Characteristicks of Men, Manners, Opinions, Times (also known as "Shaftesbury's Characteristics")
Daniel Defoe
The British Visions
An Essay on the History of Parties
An Essay on the South-Sea Trade
The Present State of the Parties in Great Britain  (attributed)
The Secret History of the October Club
John Dennis – Reflections Critical and Satyrical, Upon a Late Rhapsody call'd, An Essay upon Criticism (Dennis's counterattack on Alexander Pope)
John Gay – The Present State of Wit (satirical answer to Defoe)
William King – The History of the Heathen Gods
George Mackenzie – Several Proposals Conducing to a Further Union of Britain
Samuel Richter (Sincerus Renatus) – Theo-Philosophica Theoretica et Practica
Richard Steele, Joseph Addison, Eustace Budgell, et al. – The Spectator
John Strype – The Life and Acts of Matthew Parker
Jonathan Swift
Miscellanies in Prose and Verse
The Conduct of the Allies (contra Marlborough and the War of the Spanish Succession)
Thormodus Torfæus – Historia Rerum Norvegicarum
Ned Ward – The Life and Notable Adventures of that Renown'd Knight Don Quixote de la Mancha (in verse)
William Whiston – Primitive Christianity Revived, vol. 1

Drama
Chikamatsu Monzaemon (近松 門左衛門) – The Courier for Hell (冥途の飛脚, Meido no hikyaku)
Prosper Jolyot de Crébillon – Rhadamiste et Zénobie
Charles Johnson – 
 The Generous Husband
 The Wife's Relief
 Elkanah Settle – The City Ramble
Richard Steele – The Man of Mode

Poetry

Alexander Pope – An Essay on Criticism

Births
April 26 – Jeanne-Marie Leprince de Beaumont, French novelist (died 1780)
May 7 – David Hume, Scottish philosopher (died 1776)
May 18 – Roger Joseph Boscovich, Ragusan (Croatian) poet and polymath (died 1787)
May 31 – Johann Heinrich Samuel Formey, German philosopher writing in French  (died 1797)
October 12 – William Tytler, Scottish historian (died 1792)
October 17 – Jupiter Hammon, American poet (died c. 1806)
November 19 – Mikhail Lomonosov, Russian writer and polymath (died 1765)
December 6 – Kitty Clive, English actress and writer of farce (died 1785)
unknown date – William Smith, English classicist and Anglican dean (died 1787)

Deaths
January 5 – Mary Rowlandson, American autobiographer (born 1635)
February 10 – Richard Duke, English poet and cleric (born 1658)
March 13 – Nicolas Boileau-Despréaux, French poet and critic (born 1636)
March 19 – Bishop Thomas Ken, English theologian and hymnist (born 1637)
April 11 – François Lamy, French Benedictine apologist (born 1636)
May 2 – Laurence Hyde, 1st Earl of Rochester, English writer and statesman (born 1641)
June 7 – Henry Dodwell, Irish theologian (born 1641)
June 10 – Johannes Munnicks, Dutch medical writer (born 1652)
September 4 – John Caryll, English poet, dramatist and diplomat (born 1625)
October 3 – Richard Bulstrode, English memoirist (born 1610)
November 3 – John Ernest Grabe, German-born English theologian (born 1666)

References

 
Years of the 18th century in literature